Mount Livadiyskaya ( or ), unofficially known as Mount Pedan or Mount Pidan is one of the highest peaks in Shkotovsky District of Primorsky Krai, Russia.

Livadiyskaya is a part of the Livadiysky Range of the Sikhote-Alin.

The history of the mountain is often mystified, due to the presence of megaliths. These attract adepts of different neopagan and other faiths.

The mountain is a popular hiking spot, which has seen a surge in the number of ascensions in recent years.   This has resulted in worsening contamination.

Livadiyskaya
Livadiyskaya
Megalithic monuments